The Three Just Men is a 1925 thriller novel by the British writer Edgar Wallace. It is a part of a series of novels, sequels to The Four Just Men, featuring a group of vigilantes committed to fighting crime and wrongdoers by any means.

References

Bibliography
 Hardy, Phil. The BFI Companion to Crime. A&C Black, 1997.

External links
 

1925 British novels
British thriller novels
Novels by Edgar Wallace